Vecumnieki Parish is an administrative unit of Bauska Municipality in the Semigallia region of Latvia.

History 
The Old Town of Vecumnieki historically has been home to the Drächen Manor ( Gut Drakken ), the Mansion Manor ( Gut Mißhof ), the Reschenhof Manor, the (Gut Wiexten, in  Umparte ), Vecmuiža (Neugut, in Vecumnieki).

Until 1940 the parish was called  Vecmuižas pagasts. In 1935, its area was 255.3 km2. In 1945, Vecumnieki, Birznieku, Umpartes and Vīksniņa village were formed in the parish, but the parish was liquidated in 1949. In 1951, the territory of Kolkhoz the "Red Star"  in Vīksniņa village was added to the village of Vecumnieki, in 1954 villages of Birznieki and Umparte both were added as well. In 1977, small areas were exchanged with Birzgale Parish.  In 1990, the village was reorganized into a parish.  In 2009, the parish was included as one of the administrative territories of the Vecumnieki Municipality.

Towns, villages and settlements of Vecumnieki parish 
 Vecumnieki

Parishes of Latvia
Bauska Municipality
Semigallia